The Green Rock-hopper grasshopper, Brachaspis collinus is an alpine species of short-horned grasshopper in the family Acrididae. It is found in New Zealand in the mountains of northern South Island, above the tree line and as high as 2000 m asl. In New Zealand alpine grasshoppers can freeze solid at any time of the year and are alive when they thaw out when temperatures rise. 

Brachaspis collinus is flightless and adults are relative large (females 32 cm), and common amongst scree and tussock. Although widespread in 2020, about 97% of the habitat of the green rock-hopper grasshopper will be lost due to global warming by 2070. The species is variable in colour; most individuals are green with yellow markings, but some are olive-grey. In the Kaikoura ranges (Mt Luxford) B. collinus hybridises with B. nivalis, but elsewhere the two species are well differentiated. 

An endemic species of mite (Erythrites jacksoni) is an ectoparasite of this grasshopper.

References

External links

 

Acrididae